Anna Vitaliyevna Gavrilenko is a Russian group rhythmic gymnast and Olympic champion.

Career 
Gavrilenko started rhythmic gymnastics at an early age. In 2003, she became a member of the Russian national team since 2003. After initially competing as an individual gymnast, she made her breakthrough in 2006 as a member of the Russian group that won the gold medal at the 2006 European Championships. Gavrilenko was member of the golden winning Russian Group at the 2007 World Championships in Patras, Greece.

Gavrilenko was also a member of the Russian group that competed at the 2008 Summer Olympics in Beijing where she received a gold medal in the rhythmic group competition. She completed her career at the end of the 2008 season.

Detailed Olympic results

References

External links
 
 

1990 births
Living people
Russian rhythmic gymnasts
Gymnasts at the 2008 Summer Olympics
Olympic gymnasts of Russia
Olympic gold medalists for Russia
Sportspeople from Yekaterinburg
Olympic medalists in gymnastics
Medalists at the 2008 Summer Olympics
Medalists at the Rhythmic Gymnastics World Championships
Medalists at the Rhythmic Gymnastics European Championships
21st-century Russian women